A turkey shoot is an extremely one-sided battle or contest.

Turkey shoot may also refer to:
 Turkey Shoot (1982 film), directed by Brian Trenchard-Smith
 Turkey Shoot (2014 film), directed by Jon Hewitt
 "Turkey Shoot", Season 1 Episode 7 of Schitt's Creek
 Turkey Shoot (video game), a 1984 light gun arcade game by Williams